Kennington Cross is a locality in the London Borough of Lambeth.
It is at the junction of two major roads, Kennington Lane that links Vauxhall Cross with the Elephant and Castle and Kennington Road that runs from Waterloo to Kennington Park.
At the junction are the Durning Library (London Borough of Lambeth), St Anselm's Church (Church of England) and The ArtsLav project, a nineteenth-century underground gents Victorian Lavatory converted into a small local arts venue. 
There are two large public houses, The Dog House, and The Tommyfield.

References 

http://pubshistory.com/LondonPubs/Lambeth/Roebuck.shtml

Districts of the London Borough of Lambeth
Buildings and structures in the London Borough of Lambeth
History of the London Borough of Lambeth
Streets in the London Borough of Lambeth
Kennington